Marc Birsens (born 17 September 1966) is a former football player from Luxembourg.

International career
He was a member of the Luxembourg national football team from 1988 to 2000.

External links

1966 births
Living people
Luxembourgian footballers
Luxembourg international footballers
US Rumelange players
Union Luxembourg players
CS Grevenmacher players
Association football defenders